EDI is a free software integrated development environment available under the GNU General Public License version 2.0. It is written in C and runs on any Linux, BSD, and Unix system with limited support for macOS and Windows.

Development
EDI development was started in 2013 by ajwillia.ms, it is now being developed by a small group of members of the Enlightenment (software) development team as well as other individuals.

Features

EDI includes editor themes, translucency, multiple panels, split editor, file management, autosuggest, syntax highlighting, integrated source code management, tabbed browsing, build management, desktop notification, integrated debugging and profiling, search and replace (file and project-wide), downloading existing remote projects as well as helping developers keep track of their work with an itemised TODO checklist amongst others.

Using a pluggable infrastructure it supports projects based on C, Go, Rust or Python and their relevant built tools (autotools, meson, etc...). The build tools allow you to compile (if appropriate) the software currently being edited, run tests and launch the application binary to test your changes. It supports UTF-8 encoded files as well as plain Ascii.

Reception
Although EDI is in early development stages the reception has been positive.

Versions of the software have already been packaged in Arch Linux, Bodhi Linux (where it has been voted 3.8 stars), Gentoo, Sparky Linux, and a community remaster of PCLinuxOS

See also
 Enlightenment (software)
 Enlightenment Foundation Libraries

References

External links 
 
 
 

Free integrated development environments
Linux integrated development environments
Software using the GPL license